The Paper Man (lit. "Lafortune in Paper") is a Canadian documentary film, directed by Tanya Lapointe and released in 2020. The film is a portrait of Claude Lafortune, a paper artist who was an influential personality in Québécois children's television.

Lapointe began making the film in 2018 with an intention to work toward releasing it in 2021 or 2022, but sped up production following Lafortune's death of COVID-19 in April 2020. The film premiered at the 2020 Whistler Film Festival, where it received an honourable mention from the jury for the Whistler Film Festival Documentary Award, and won the Audience Award.

References

External links

Official Site

2020 films
2020 documentary films
Canadian documentary films
Quebec films
Documentary films about visual artists
2020s French-language films
French-language Canadian films
2020s Canadian films